In U.S. and Canadian aviation, MULTICOM is a frequency allocation used as a Common Traffic Advisory Frequency (CTAF) by aircraft near airports where no air traffic control is available.  Frequency allocations vary from region to region.

Despite the use of uppercase letters, MULTICOM is not an abbreviation or acronym.

In the United States, there is one MULTICOM frequency: 122.9 MHz. (See AIM table 4-1-2 or AIM table 4-1-1)  At uncontrolled airports without a UNICOM, pilots are to self-announce on the MULTICOM frequency.

In Australia, there is one MULTICOM frequency: 126.7 MHz.

In Brazil, there is one MULTICOM frequency: 123.45 MHz.

See also 
 UNICOM
 CTAF

Airbands
Aviation communications
Avionics
Air traffic control